Battrick is a surname. Notable people with the surname include: 

Gerald Battrick (1947–1998), Welsh tennis player
Naomi Battrick (born 1991), English actress

See also
Buttrick